"Day Drunk" is a song recorded by Australian country music singer Morgan Evans, released on 8 June 2018 as the third single from his fourth EP Morgan Evans EP and second studio album Things That We Drink To. Evans told Taste of Country "I've never been the 'drinking song' guy, but this song came from a real place and is really more about spending a day with your person than it is about just going getting drunk. There's a reason why I love it so much and feel like I can sing it." "Day Drunk" peaked at number 27 on the ARIA Singles Chart. The song was written by Evans, along with Lindy Robbins and Chris DeStefano, the latter of whom produced it.

At the 2019 Country Music Awards of Australia, the song won Single of the Year.

At the APRA Music Awards of 2019, the song won Country Work of the Year.

At the ARIA Music Awards of 2019, the song was nominated for Song of the Year.

At the APRA Music Awards of 2020, "Day Drunk" was nominated for Most Performed Country Work of the Year.

Music video
There are two versions of the Day Drunk music video:

1) "Hawaii Version".  This music video was released on 29 June 2018. It captures Evans and wife Kelsea Ballerini enjoying waterslides, waterfalls and hours of bliss and relaxation on a recent vacation in Hawaii.

2) "Reverse Version".  Directed by Colin Duffy, this video was filmed entirely in reverse in LA, and was released in August 2019.
(http://www.soundslikenashville.com/music/morgan-evans-day-drunk-video-2/)

Critical reception
Thomas Bleach ThomasBleach.com referred to "Day Drunk" in an album review as "playful" and "bright", and described it as having a "catchy hook".

Track listing

Charts

Weekly charts

Year-end charts

Certifications

Release history

References

2018 singles
Morgan Evans (singer) songs
Universal Music Australia singles
Songs written by Chris DeStefano
Songs written by Lindy Robbins
Songs about alcohol
2018 songs
APRA Award winners